Ulanbel is a village in Moiynkum District, Jambyl Region, Kazakhstan. It is the administrative center of the Ulanbel Rural District (KATO code - 315647100). Population:

Geography
The village lies at the northern edge of the Moiynkum Desert.

References

Populated places in Jambyl Region
Chu (river)